Mick Tilse is an Australian former professional rugby league footballer who played in the 1980s.  Tilse played for North Sydney and Canberra in the NSWRL competition.  Tilse was a foundation player for Canberra playing in the club's first ever game.  Tilse is the father of former Newcastle Knights and Canberra player Dane Tilse.

Playing career
Tilse made his first grade debut for North Sydney in Round 15 1980 against Canterbury at Belmore Oval.

In 1982, Tilse joined newly admitted Canberra and played in the club's first ever game, a 37–7 loss against South Sydney at Redfern Oval.

Canberra would only go on to win 4 games in 1982 and finished last on the table claiming the wooden spoon.  As of 2019, this is the only time that Canberra has finished last.

Tilse remarkably went his whole first grade career without playing in a winning match being on the losing side in all 15 of his first grade games.

References

Canberra Raiders players
North Sydney Bears players
Australian rugby league players
Rugby league props
Rugby league second-rows
Living people
Year of birth missing (living people)
Place of birth missing (living people)